Delia Pemberton (born 1954) is an author and lecturer in Egyptology, formerly with the British Museum and Birkbeck College, University of London, UK. Best known for her work in museum education, she has published a number of popular works on ancient Egypt and related topics for both adults and children.

Partial bibliography

Books and articles for adults
 City Guide: Cairo and Luxor, Collins Travellers' series, HarperCollins, 1991
 Travellers' Architectural Guides: Ancient Egypt, Viking Penguin (UK)/Chronicle (US), 1992
 The British Museum Pocket Treasury, British Museum Press (reprinted 2004/2006 as The British Museum Little Book of Treasures), 1996
 'Young Visitors' in Behind the Scenes at the British Museum, ed A. Burnett and J. Reeve, British Museum Press, 2001
 Treasures of the Pharaohs, (introduction by Joann Fletcher), Duncan Baird Publications, 2004
 Cats, British Museum Press, 2006

Books and articles for children
 (Co-author with Geraldine Harris) British Museum Illustrated Encyclopaedia of Ancient Egypt, British Museum Press, 1999
 Egyptian Mummies: People from the Past, British Museum Press, 2001
 The Pyramid Activity Book, British Museum Press, 2003
 My Egyptian Mummy File, British Museum Press, 2003
 (Co-author with Daniel Pemberton) The Mammoth Prehistoric Activity Book, British Museum Press, 2004
 'Talking Pictures: Ancient Egyptian Hieroglyphics' in Young Archaeologist 122, Winter 2004
 The British Museum Illustrated Atlas of Egypt, British Museum Press, 2005

References
Article, The Times, 26 February 2005.
Woman's Hour, BBC Radio 4, 28 February 2005.
Article, The Guardian, 2 September 2002.
DigiGuide TV website, 26 January 2008.

1954 births
Living people
English Egyptologists
Academics of Birkbeck, University of London
Employees of the British Museum